David "Dai" Thomas Harris (born 15 February 1879 – second ¼ 1958) was a Welsh rugby union, and professional rugby league footballer who played in the 1900s.

Background
Dai Harris was born in Morriston, Wales, he was a blacksmith's assistant, and his death aged 79 was registered in Neath district, Wales.

Playing career

International honours
Dai Harris won a cap, playing right-, i.e. number 4, and scored the third try, for Other Nationalities in the 9–3 victory over England at Central Park, Wigan on Tuesday 5 April 1904, in the first ever international rugby league match.

Club career
During Dai Harris' time at Wigan, they won the South West Lancashire League in 1904–05.

References

External links
Statistics at wigan.rlfans.com
Memento of a Great Dai in Wigan
(archived by archive.is) 105-year-old Wales cap to go under the hammer
(archived by archive.is) Dai Harris Rugby League cap v England 1904
On This Day - 5 April 1904
(archived by archive.is) England v Other Nationalities - 5 April 1904 - The First International Rugby League Match
Code-switch international's 1904 cap up for auction

1879 births
1958 deaths
Footballers who switched code
Other Nationalities rugby league team players
Place of death missing
Rugby league centres
Rugby league players from Swansea
Rugby union centres
Rugby union players from Morriston
Treherbert RFC players
Welsh rugby league players
Welsh rugby union players
Wigan Warriors players